Bernt Sverre Evensen (18 April 1905 – 24 August 1979) was a Norwegian speed skater and racing cyclist who competed in skating at the 1928 and 1932 Winter Olympics.

In 1928 he became the first Norwegian skater to win an Olympic gold medal by winning the 500 m event (first place shared with Clas Thunberg). At the same Olympics, he also won silver in the 1500 m and bronze over 5,000 m. He was in second place in the 10,000 m event, 0.1 seconds behind Irving Jaffee, when the competition was cancelled because the ice had started thawing.

At the 1932 Olympics in Lake Placid, Evensen won a silver medal in the 500 m. Evensen and compatriot Ivar Ballangrud were the only European Olympic speed skating medalists during those games. This can mostly be attributed to the fact that the races were skated in pack-style (having all competitors skate at the same time), a format that most European skaters were not familiar with.

At the World Allround Championships, Evensen finished first in 1927 and 1934, second in 1931, and third in 1926, 1928, and 1932. At the European Allround Championships, Evensen won the gold medal in 1927 and silvers in 1928 and 1935. As a cyclist, he won 11 Norwegian championships. For his achievements in speed skating and cycling, he was awarded the Egebergs Ærespris in 1928. After World War II, he was a speed skating coach for Oslo Skøiteklub (OSK) before the speed skating revolution in 1962–1963. His grandson Stig Kristiansen became an Olympic cyclist.

Medals
An overview of medals won by Evensen at important championships he participated in, listing the years in which he won each:

Personal records
To put these personal records in perspective, the last column (Notes) lists the official world records on the dates that Evensen skated his personal records.

      

      

Evensen has an Adelskalender score of 194.246 points. His highest ranking on the Adelskalender was a fourth place.

References

External links

 Evert Stenlund's Adelskalender pages
 Historical World Records from the International Skating Union
 National Championships results from Norges Skøyteforbund (the Norwegian Skating Association)

1905 births
1979 deaths
Norwegian male speed skaters
Norwegian male cyclists
Norwegian speed skating coaches
Olympic speed skaters of Norway
Speed skaters at the 1928 Winter Olympics
Speed skaters at the 1932 Winter Olympics
Olympic gold medalists for Norway
Olympic silver medalists for Norway
Olympic bronze medalists for Norway
Olympic medalists in speed skating
Sportspeople from Oslo
Medalists at the 1928 Winter Olympics
Medalists at the 1932 Winter Olympics
World Allround Speed Skating Championships medalists
20th-century Norwegian people